John Culpepper was an American politician.

John Culpepper, Culpeper or Colepeper may also refer to:

 John Colepeper, 1st Baron Colepeper (c. 1600–1660), English Royalist landowner, military adviser, politician, Chancellor of the Exchequer, Master of the Rolls and influential counsellor of King Charles I during the English Civil War
 John Culpeper (died 1414), English knight
 John Culpeper, leader of Culpeper's Rebellion in 1677 in the province of Carolina in North America
 J. Broward Culpepper, John Broward Culpepper (1907–1990), influence on university education in Florida
 Brad Culpepper, John Broward Culpepper (born 1969), American National Football League player
 John Culpepper (MP) for Rutland (UK Parliament constituency)